Pankrono is a town in the Kwabre East District of the Ashanti Region of Ghana, noted for its pottery.

Location
Pankrono is 8 kilometres on the Kumasi - Mampong Highway.
It is located after Tafo.

See also
 Adanwomase

References

Populated places in the Ashanti Region